The Yorkshire Hockey Association runs hockey in Yorkshire, England.  The YHA administers the Yorkshire Hockey Leagues and has numerous men's and women's divisions, as well as junior leagues, for a wide range of abilities.  It is the county level league for all hockey clubs in Yorkshire as well as some clubs based in Lincolnshire and Nottinghamshire.

Official website 

 Official site of the Yorkshire HA

Field hockey governing bodies in England
Field hockey